Group A of the 2010 Fed Cup Europe/Africa Zone Group I was one of four pools in the Europe/Africa Zone Group I of the 2010 Fed Cup. Four teams competed in a round-robin competition, with the top team and the bottom team proceeding to their respective sections of the play-offs: the top team played for advancement to the World Group II Play-offs, while the bottom team faced potential relegation to Group II.

Israel vs. Slovenia

Netherlands vs. Bulgaria

Israel vs. Bulgaria

Netherlands vs. Slovenia

Israel vs. Netherlands

Slovenia vs. Bulgaria

References

External links 
 Fed Cup website

2010 Fed Cup Europe/Africa Zone